Calvin Woolsey (December 26, 1883 – November 12, 1946) was an American physician and pianist.

Biography
Woolsey was the middle of three children born to Napoleon and Gertrude Woolsey.  Woolsey was a descendant of George (Joris) Woolsey, one of the earliest settlers of New Amsterdam, and Thomas Cornell (settler).

Woolsey was raised in Tinney Grove, Missouri, just south of the city of Braymer.  He earned a medical degree from the University of Missouri and did his post-graduate work at Harvard Medical School.  He joined the Army Medical Corps during World War I and attained the rank of 1st Lieutenant.

He composed rags in the folk ragtime style that was popular around 1900.  He sold two of these to Jerome H. Remick and self-published several others.  He also published a waltz and a march.

He died at home, in 1946, of a coronary thrombosis.

Compositions

 "Funny Bones" (rag, 1909)
 "Dissatisfied" (1910)
 "Poison Rag" (1910)
 "Medic Rag" (1910)
 "Peroxide Rag" (1910)
 "Mashed Potatoes" (rag, 1911)
 "Bill Johnson" (1912)
 "Purple and White" (march, 1913)
 "Lover's Lane Glide" (rag, 1914)
 "Hearts Across The Sea" (waltz, 1918)

See also
 List of ragtime composers

References

External links
 

1883 births
1946 deaths
American male composers
American composers
People from Ray County, Missouri
Ragtime composers
American pianists
Harvard Medical School alumni
University of Missouri alumni
United States Army Medical Corps officers
United States Army personnel of World War I
Cornell family
Woolsey family
American male pianists
20th-century American male musicians